Emanuel Sandhu (born November 18, 1980) is a Canadian figure skater and dancer. He is the 2004 Grand Prix Final champion and a three-time Canadian national champion.

Personal life
Sandhu was born on November 18, 1980 in Toronto, Ontario, Canada. He was raised in Richmond Hill, Ontario with his younger brothers Chris and Daniel. His father, Lokraj, is Indian Sikh and his mother, Enza, was born in Italy. He is fluent in English, French, and Italian. Sandhu dabbles in modeling and singing.

Career

Skating
Sandhu began figure skating at the age of eight. A year later, he was discovered by coach Joanne McLeod who would serve as his coach for his entire career. Sandhu later relocated to Burnaby, British Columbia to continue training at the B.C. Centre of Excellence with McLeod, whom he credited as being his biggest support system.

He had early success in Canada, placing second in his first Canadian nationals. Sandhu's success qualified him for the 1998 Olympics in Nagano, but the Canadian Olympic committee refused to send him because, while he met the criteria of the Canadian Figure Skating Association, he did not meet theirs. He had missed the Grand Prix season because of injury while Langdon did not. Sandhu was a recipient of the Indo-Canadian Chamber of Commerce Lifetime Achievement Award in 1998.

Sandhu qualified for the 2002 Olympics in Salt Lake City, but was forced to withdraw before the short program due to injury. He also withdrew from the World Championships that year. Sandhu's father had left the family years earlier, and Sandhu was reunited with him prior to the 2002 Olympic Games. Sandhu stated that he was almost relieved to have to withdraw with an injury, because it was difficult dealing with his father's return.

Sandhu was the Canadian Nationals Champion in 2001, 2003 and 2004, and he won the Grand Prix Final in 2004, his most successful season. In winning the Grand Prix Final, Sandhu beat reigning World Champion Evgeni Plushenko and is one of only two people (with Brian Joubert) to beat Plushenko in the 2002-2006 quadrennium. This win was even more notable because Sandhu was a substitute, not having medaled at his Grand Prix events that season. Sandhu went on to win his third Canadian title and to take the silver medal at the 2004 Four Continents, his highest placement at the event.

Despite his various victories, Sandhu was inconsistent at major events. He kept his eligibility following the 2006 Olympics season. He competed at Cup of China, where he won the bronze medal, and Cup of Russia, where he placed fifth. At the 2007 Nationals, he was unable to hold onto silver and dropped to third, his lowest placement at the senior level at Nationals. His season continued its downward trend as he placed ninth at the 2007 Four Continents. He placed 16th at the 2007 Worlds.

In 2011, Sandhu performed in the Art on Ice show in China. He also registered to compete in a qualifying competition for the 2012 Canadian Nationals, his first competition since 2007. He withdrew because of a foot injury and lack of preparation time due to ice shows.

Sandhu returned to competition in December 2012 at the 2013 Skate Canada Challenge; he finished fifth, which qualified him for the 2013 Canadian Nationals. Commenting on his decision to return to competition, Sandhu said, "I don't want the feeling I have when I look back on the sport to be one that isn't full of joy, happiness and satisfaction. I probably would think about it the rest of my life if I didn't try." He trained without a coach in Burnaby, British Columbia. Sandhu went on to finish 9th in the short program and 11th overall at the 2013 Canadian Nationals.

Dance
Sandhu began studying ballet at the age of three and continued to dance until the end of high school. He graduated from The National Ballet School of Canada.

In May 2008, Sandhu auditioned for So You Think You Can Dance Canada in Vancouver, British Columbia, and qualified for the final audition round in Toronto. He succeeded past all but the final round of auditions and was cut when selections were made for the show's Top 20.

Sandhu again auditioned during the second season of So You Think You Can Dance Canada, but this time made it into the Top 20. He finished in the Top 6 as the third-ranked male dancer.

Programs

Competitive highlights
GP: Grand Prix; JGP: Junior Grand Prix

References

External links

 Skate Canada profile
 
 Modeling portfolio

1980 births
Canadian male single skaters
Figure skaters at the 2006 Winter Olympics
Canadian sportspeople of Indian descent
Living people
Olympic figure skaters of Canada
Figure skaters from Toronto
Sportspeople from Burnaby
Canadian male dancers
So You Think You Can Dance Canada contestants
Canadian people of Punjabi descent
Four Continents Figure Skating Championships medalists
Competitors at the 2001 Goodwill Games